Alain Corbin (born January 12, 1936 in Lonlay-l'Abbaye) is a French historian. He is a specialist of the 19th century in France and in microhistory.

Trained in the Annales School, Corbin's work has moved away from the large-scale collective structures studied by Fernand Braudel towards a history of sensibilities which is closer to Lucien Febvre's  history of mentalités. His books have explored the histories of such subjects as male desire and prostitution, sensory experience of smell and sound, and the 1870 burning of a young nobleman in a Dordogne village.

Works

 
Translation: Women for Hire: Prostitution and Sexuality in France after 1850, (published 1996)

Translation: The Lure of the Sea: The Discovery of the Seaside in the Western World, 1750-1840, (published 1994)
 
Translation: The Foul and the Fragrant: Odor and the French Social Imagination), (published 1988)

Translation: The Village of Cannibals: Rage and Murder in France, 1870, (published 1993)
 
Translation: Village Bells: Sound and Meaning in the 19th-century French Countryside, (published 1998)

Translation: Time, Desire, and Horror: Towards a History of the Senses, (published 1995)

Translation: The Life of an Unknown: The Rediscovered World of a Clog Maker in Nineteenth-century France, (published 2001)

Translation: A History of Silence: From the Renaissance to the Present Day, (published 2018)

Translation: Terra Incognita: A History of Ignorance in the 18th and 19th Centuries, (published 2021)

Bibliography
 For a general overview on his work, see S. Godfrey "Alain Corbin : Making Sense of French History », French Historical Studies, vol. 25, n° 2, 2002, p. 381-398 
 See also Dominique kalifa, "L’expérience, le désir et l’histoire. Alain Corbin ou le tournant culturel silencieux", in “Alain Corbin and the writing of History”, French Politics, Culture &  Society, vol. 22, n° 2, 2004, p. 14-25.

References

1936 births
Living people
Microhistorians
20th-century French historians
21st-century French historians
People from Orne
French male non-fiction writers
Blaise Pascal University alumni